Everbright Sun Hung Kai, formerly known as Sun Hung Kai Financial, is a subsidiary of Everbright Securities Company Limited that provides financial services for retail, corporate, and institutional clients. It was founded in 1969 by Fung King Hey, Kwok Tak Seng and Lee Shau Kee. The company operates under the Sun Hung Kai Financial brand and the SHK Direct and SHK Private sub-brands and has a presence in Hong Kong, Macau and Mainland China. Through its subsidiaries, the company had about HK$105 billion in assets under management, custody, or advice as of 30 September 2017.

History
1969 Sun Hung Kai & Co. is formed by Fung King Hey, Kwok Tak Seng, and  Lee Shau Kee. 
1973 Sun Hung Kai Securities Limited is incorporated.
1983 Sun Hung Kai & Co. is listed on the Hong Kong stock exchange.
1991 Sun Hung Kai Investment Services Limited becomes one of the first underwriters and approved overseas agents for the Shanghai and Shenzhen Stock Exchanges.
1993 Sun Hung Kai Investment Services is approved as a B-share seat holder of the Shanghai and Shenzhen Stock Exchanges.
1996 Allied Properties (H.K.) Limited acquires the Fung family's equity interest in the company.
1997 Sun Hung Kai Investment Services is approved as a Foreign Share Broker and Lead Underwriter by the China Securities Regulatory Commission.
2000 SHK Direct launches, offering straight-through internet-based order processing.
2002 The Company diversifies its operations by establishing wealth management and alternative investment businesses.
2010 The Group forms alliances with CVC Capital Partners and Macquarie FX Investments Pty Limited.
2011 Sun Hung Kai Private is established as a wealth management service. Sun Hung Kai Financial forms a strategic alliance with Look's Asset Management Limited.
2015 In June, Everbright Securities completes acquisition of a 70% stake in Sun Hung Kai Financial through its Hong Kong subsidiary Everbright Securities Financial Holding Limited.
2017 In December, Sun Hung Kai Financial is officially renamed as Everbright Sun Hung Kai.

References

 

Financial services companies of Hong Kong
Investment banks in Hong Kong
Sun Hung Kai Properties
Financial services companies established in 1969
1969 establishments in Hong Kong
Companies listed on the Hong Kong Stock Exchange